The Rev. Matthys Michielse du Toit (Montagu, Cape Colony, December 3, 1874 - Cape Town, August 18, 1959) was from 1905 until he accepted his emeritus in 1941 the pastor in six congregations of the Dutch Reformed Church in South Africa (NGK), including one in South West Africa, two in the Orange Free State, and three in Cape Province: Barrydale (1905-1912), Reddersburg (1912-1920), Excelsior (1920-1921), Moria (now Otjiwarongo, 1921-1922), Hopetown (1922-1925), and finally Joubertina (1925-1941). According to his own grateful testimony, "the Lord's blessing must have shadowed the work for so many Souls to be brought to the light."

Especially in the last of these congregations, the mission progressed greatly under his leadership. He was long a loyal and avid member of the NGK's General Mission Commission. After accepting his emeritus, he spent a great deal of time working in various congregations, including hospital work. At the time of his death at 85, he was the only survivor of the 17 proponents with whom he was ordained in 1904.

Childhood and education 
Matthys Michielse du Toit was born the oldest son of his parents in Montagu, where he worked in his father's general store after finishing school. He received his calling in 1891 during a major spiritual revival in Montagu, spurring him to begin a long spiritual education, first in Montagu and later in Stellenbosch, which led him and 16 other candidates to the ministry in December 1904.

Family life 
On March 13, 1906, the young pastor married Ms. Anna Johanna Le Roux (born September 4, 1879) in Paarl. After a happy marriage of 33 years, she died at their home in Joubertina on Sunday, December 17, 1939. They had four sons who all graduated from Stellenbosch University. After around 16 months alone in the Joubertina parsonage, the Rev. du Toit married once more to E.M. de Wet (née Lombard) in Queenstown. Several weeks later, he accepted his emeritus, and after many more years of volunteer work, died in Rondebosch.

Barrydale 
The Rev. Du Toit arrived in Barrydale in 1905. In those days, a minister was expected to hold three services every Sunday. He found this taxing for his throat and the church council granted him just two of them on a doctor's advice. During his time there, a new church was built and expanded. On December 12, 1905, a special service was held there by the former pastor, G.P. van der Merwe, to usher out the old church which had served the congregation for 28 years. Unfortunately, little is known of the words the Rev. Van der Merwe spoke here, since A.A.J. van Niekerk, writer of the congregation's centennial commemorative book, couldn't find any material on it and even the oldest members of the congregation (by 1980) were too young at the time to remember anything about it. Even the few over ninety only remembered the identity of the speaker.

In Ons Kerk Album, he is said to have worked tirelessly for the mission and to have "nurtured much real love for the cause of the Great King" among this congregation.

Moria 
At the church council meeting on April 4, 1921, of what was at the time Moria, now Otjiwarongo, the council pledged £100 to recruit a more competent pastor for the congregation over the following year. The ring passed to the Rev. M.M. du Toit, earlier of Reddersburg and Excelsior, and at the council meeting on August 6, 1921, in Omaruru, he was accepted for the post. The Rev. Du Toit set out at once to visit the different districts in the congregation, particularly those where the railway workers who made up a large proportion of the congregation lived. Articles about his work in the Kerkbode (November 10, 1921 - November 22, 1922) give an interesting description of the times. He traveled widely, as much as 11,000 miles in one year. Most places were now accessible by rail, but he also had to use many other vehicles: "passenger train, freight train, automobile, trolley, horse-cart, mule-cart, donkey-cart, and oxcart. He even tried riding a camel."

The Rev. Du Toit apparently succeeded in getting the cooperation of various local officials. Of Gys Hofmeyr, administrator at the time, he said: "He is not only a faithful supporter and lover of the church, but someone who confesses his love of the Lord out loud." In the Kerkbode of December 27, 1922, he published a primer to better educate the growing membership, who now numbered around 6,500 in South West Africa. W. Badenhorst and W. Hauptfleisch, stationmaster and postmaster of Karibib respectively, were "stalwarts"; and J. Hamilton, earlier an Irish Catholic, found his Sunday school in Swakopmund a great blessing. From his informative report for the Britstown Ring (1922), the Rev. Du Toit showcased his work with the Moria congregation: he had held 191 services, including 167 in Moria and 24 in Gibeon (later capital of the Mariental Reformed Church (NGK)); 21 young members were confirmed and 41 children baptized.

Hopetown 
The Rev. J. de Villiers, a missionary, was there to welcome Rev. Du Toit on his investitutre as pastor of the Hopetown Reformed Church (NGK) in 1922. The Rev. Du Toit worked for three years at the grueling task of not only serving the congregation itself but also traveling "in withering heat, over immense distances" to the three diamond mines within the congregation's remit. The labors took a toll on his health, as he is quoted in memoirs excerpted for the congregation's 75th anniversary commemorative book. He recalled with gratitude that his debt of £3,200 was cancelled. He remembered in particular the Pentecost revivals held by the congregation at Pentecost and the congregation's healthy relationship with the mission church.

In 1923, the diggings at Brakfontein Farm were proclaimed public by W. Higgs (magistrate of Hopetown). A diamond rush was on, and prospector shacks sprung up like toadstools overnight. In the years that the Rev. Du Toit was pastor, the church sold its flock of sheep to supplement collections and thus pay the church's debt. A grateful congregation's church council was thereby able to buy the pastor a car to drive around the mining towns. In 1925, the church council once more provided a car to the Rev. G. Oosthuizen.

The church's inside was renovated then. No more would the congregation need to sit far away from the pulpit to see the pastor, since the pews were moved into a sloping floor so that one could overlook the other. From 1917 onward, the women of the congregation managed the cemetery.

Joubertina 
After the resignation of the Rev. Van Rensburg of the Joubertina Reformed Church (NGK) in the Langkloof, the Revs. P.J. Van der Merwe (Murray, De Doorns), W.N. van der Merwe (Wellington), and Du Toit were considered. Du Toit was officially inaugurated on Friday, September 25, 1925, and he, his wife, and their sons were ushered from Twee Riviere in a procession of 18 automobiles, 38 carriages, and 68 cavalry to their welcome in Joubertina. His confirmation was held that Saturday night by the Rev. C.H. Stulting (Humansdorp). His first communion followed on Sunday morning, and he sermonized in the afternoon on 2 Corinthians 12: "I'm looking for you. (i) What we seek, (ii) The road on which we search for it, (iii) How you can help us in this search."

General matters 
At the first Pentecost service the Rev. Du Toit celebrated with his new congregation, he was blessed by closing prayers from 82 worshipers, including 48 of the youth and children. Each communion weekend, he held five services. Saturday afternoon was the preparatory service, Saturday night was another service after which followed the church council meeting. Early Sunday morning was the children's service in the church followed by the communion service. Sunday afternoon followed another service at which baptisms were held, and Sunday night was the reflection service.

In 1918, the church council began several years of negotiations to acquire 800 acres of land in the Diepkloof Rock Shelter hills for £320. The Rev. Du Toit explored the idea of planting trees on the hills and even setting up a lumber plantation.

The community of the Langkloof suffered a great loss with the sudden death of Mr. Giel Bokkie Olivier on April 28, 1928. He was for years a deacon, auctioneer at the thanksgiving parties, and from the foundation of the congregation until 1922, a collections manager "almost pro bono." In the religious, educational, and social spheres, he was almost indispensable to Joubertina. From the first years of the congregation, Mrs. Olivier, his wife, served as secretary of the church, until she too died on September 24, 1930, leaving the church £350 in her will.

With the resignation of Mr. Olivier as collections officer, a Mr. McLachlan replaced him. In 1923, a John van der Spuy took the job for a few months but then left, at which point McLachlan returned to the post until October 7, 1925, when J.G. Deyzel was formally elected to the role, which he would fill for at least a quarter-century.

Enlargement of the church building 
Since the need for seating was only growing more pressing, plans were made starting in 1928 to build the two galleries originally planned for the church. At the same time, the clock tower had to be furnished. The clock was built by A. Fischer & Kie, and it was paid for by Sunday school contributions. The galleries had to be put on hold for financial reasons, but since the fund had grown to £3,000 by 1934, the Rev. Du Toit was free to return to the project, contracting the architect W.H. Louw of Paarl and the Oberholster construction firm in 1936. Once completed, these additions added 200 pews to the church.

Church organs 
The first organ in record at the church, purchased in 1917 for £23, replaced a harmonium Mrs. Augusta Cronje (later Mrs. M.J. Kritzinger) had presented to the church in December 1913. A larger organ was bought in 1930. Mrs. McLachlan, Mrs. Fourie, Mrs. J.L. du Preez, and others led the congregation's hymns accompanied by this instrument until better financial days arrived; in August 1935, a pipe organ was finally purchased for around £1,000, to use for the new galleries if possible. The first official organist was Mrs. M. Delport. To move the organ into place behind the pulpit, the building had to be altered, knocking out the upper hall. These changes, together with new carpeting for the church, cost around £34, but the amount was already covered, and therefore, no further collection drives were needed. The old gas plant's explosion led to the installation of a Westinghouse electric generator in 1931 to supply the church with light.

Communion bowls 

An uncontroversial change in Joubertina was the commissioning of communion bowls. In November 1929, the church council noted a donation of £100 for the purpose by the widow of M.J. Olivier in commemoration of his work as collector, and they immediately decided to use it to buy a set. Two years later, the old communion vessels were donated to the Malingunde mission in Nyasaland.

Death of the church mother 
It was a tragic day not just for her husband and children but for the congregation and the Kingdom of God as well when Mrs. Du Toit died in the vicarage after a severe illness, which had left her bedridden for eight months and an inspiration to one and all. According to the Rev. H.C. Hopkins, she was "a worthy wife and mother; a devoted, honored, and dearly beloved maidservant of the Lord; and an ornament to the rectory and the congregation. Her commitment, tact, and ingenuity made her a popular, competent, and energizing conductress. The Mission weighed heavily on her heart and she was a faithful intercessor for the Lord's work."

The Rev. Stulting, Sr. (of Humansdorp), who had also lost his wife a few months earlier, led the memorial service on the afternoon of Tuesday, December 19, 1939, and spoke passionately of John 14:1 and Prov. 31:10. At the grave, tribute was pronounced by the elder Naas Kritzinger on behalf of the church council and by Mrs. P.B. Geldenhuys in the name of the VSB and Biduursusters (lay sister organizations). The congregation sisters laid a suitable stone between the church and the meeting hall.

The Rev. Du Toit accepts his emeritus 
The weekend of May 25–26, 1941, the congregation members said goodbye to their longtime pastor, the longest-tenured in their history thus far. On Sunday morning, the Rev. Du Toit delivered a striking, practical farewell sermon to his packed church, recalling John 21:7: "It is the Lord who calls, uses, and rewards his servants."

On Monday afternoon, the next pastor came to Joubertina. As their farewell to the Rev. Du Toit, the church council recorded their appreciation for his "faithful services, courtesy, kindness, and helpfulness." For a number of years, he served on the Cape Church's important Mission and Synod Commissions, and the Rev. Hopkins predicted in 1957 that "his and his wife's names will live on in the mission in particular" in Joubertina.

Sources 
 (af) Hanekom, Dr. T.N. 1952. Die hoë toring. Die Ned. Geref. Kerk Otjiwarongo Gedenkboek (1902–1952). Otjiwarongo: NG Kerkraad.
 (af) Hopkins, H.C. 1957. Gendenkboek by die goue jubileum van die Ned. Geref. Kerk Joubertina. Joubertina: NG Kerkraad.
 (nl) Maeder, the Rev. G.A. and Zinn, Christian. 1917. Ons Kerk Album. Cape Town: Ons Kerk Album Maatschappij Bpkt.
 (af) Olivier, the Rev. P.L. (compiler). 1952. Ons gemeentelike feesalbum. Cape Town and Pretoria: N.G. Kerk-Uitgewers.
 (af) Van Niekerk, A.A.J. 1980. Barrydale 1880–1980. Die geskiedenis van ’n kerk en ’n gemeenskap. Barrydale: Die Feeskomitee.
 (af) Van Wijk, the Rev. J.H. and Geldenhuys, the Rev. Norval (chief compiler). 1959. Jaarboek van die Nederduitse Gereformeerde Kerk 1960. Cape Town: N.G. Kerk-Uitgewers.
 (af) Wiid, Rina. 2004. 150 jubeljare. 1854–2004. Hopetown: NG Kerkraad.

References 

1874 births
1959 deaths
South African Protestant ministers and clergy
Members of the Dutch Reformed Church in South Africa (NGK)